Allocephalus is a genus of flowering plants belonging to the family Asteraceae.

Its native range is Brazil.

Species:

Allocephalus gamolepis

References

Asteraceae
Asteraceae genera